Polisen i Strömstad (English: The police in Strömstad) is a Swedish drama comedy television series. It premiered on 21 January 1982 on SVT, and was filmed as five miniseries between 1982 and 1996. The series is based on Gösta Unefäldt's crime novels and was directed by Arne Lifmark. The series diverged from the books. Stefan Ljungqvist's character Evald Larsson died in first of Unefäldt's novels, but survived in the tv series and became a very popular audience favourite.

It was watched by millions of viewers when it was first broadcast on TV. The series also received praise from the police force for its credibility, because the series reflected the everyday life of the police in a good way.

Cast and characters

Episodes

References 

Swedish television series